Myriam Léonie Mani (born May 21, 1977) is a Cameroonian athlete who specialized in the 100 and 200 metres.

Mani represented Cameroon at the 2008 Summer Olympics competing at the 100 metres sprint. In her first round heat she placed third behind Torri Edwards and Jeanette Kwakye in a time of 11.64 to advance to the second round. There she failed to qualify for the semi finals as her time of 11.65 was only the sixth time of her heat, causing elimination.

Achievements 
2008 African Championships - seventh place (100 m), fifth place (200 m)
2006 African Championships - fifth place (100 m), eighth place (200 m)
2006 Commonwealth Games - eighth place (200 m)
2002 IAAF World Cup - bronze medal (200 m)
2002 African Championships - silver medal (100 m), bronze medal (200 m)
2001 IAAF Grand Prix Final - gold medal (200 m)
2001 World Championships - seventh place (200 m)
2000 African Championships - gold medal (100 m), gold medal (200 m)
1999 All-Africa Games - silver medal (100 m), silver medal (200 m)
1996 African Championships - bronze medal (100 m), bronze medal (200 m)

Personal bests
60 metres - 7.18 s (2000, indoor)
100 metres - 10.98 s (2001)
200 metres - 22.41 s (2000)

References

External links

1977 births
Living people
Cameroonian female sprinters
Athletes (track and field) at the 1992 Summer Olympics
Athletes (track and field) at the 1996 Summer Olympics
Athletes (track and field) at the 2000 Summer Olympics
Athletes (track and field) at the 2008 Summer Olympics
Olympic athletes of Cameroon
Athletes (track and field) at the 1998 Commonwealth Games
Athletes (track and field) at the 2002 Commonwealth Games
Athletes (track and field) at the 2006 Commonwealth Games
Commonwealth Games competitors for Cameroon
African Games silver medalists for Cameroon
African Games medalists in athletics (track and field)
Goodwill Games medalists in athletics
Athletes (track and field) at the 1999 All-Africa Games
Competitors at the 2001 Goodwill Games
Goodwill Games gold medalists in athletics
Olympic female sprinters
20th-century Cameroonian women
21st-century Cameroonian women